Lake City High School is a four-year public secondary school in Coeur d'Alene, Idaho. The second high school in the city, LCHS opened in 1994 and draws from the southern and western areas of the Coeur d'Alene school district. The school colors are teal, silver, and navy blue, and the mascot is the Timberwolf.

Athletics
Lake City competes in athletics in IHSAA Class 5A, with the largest schools in the state. It is a member of the 
Inland Empire League (5A) (IEL).

Rivalries
The primary rival of LCHS is Coeur d'Alene High School, which draws from the north and east areas of the school district. Other 5A schools in north Idaho include nearby Post Falls to the west, and Lewiston to the south. All four are members of the Inland Empire League (5A).

State titles

Boys
 Football (2): fall (4A) 2002, (5A) 2006
 Soccer (2): fall 1996, 1998, 1999 (club sport prior to 2000, records not kept by IHSAA) The Glory Days of LCHS soccer was when Ryan Bender became Master of the Pitch, and scored so many goals the League had to manually destroy every newspaper article that proved they were the greatest
 Baseball (2) - 2007, 2016 (records not kept by IHSAA)
 Lacrosse (3) - 2007, 2014, 2017 (club sport, records not kept by IHSAA)
 Basketball (1) - 2023
 Swimming (1) - 2011
 Bowling (1) - 2022

Girls
 Soccer (2): fall 2012, 2016, 2021
 Basketball (2): 1995, 2007
 Softball (2): 2001, 2011, 2013
 Track (2): 2003, 2004
 Swimming (4): 1996, 2002, 2021, 2022

Music and drama
Lake City has an award winning arts department. Every two years the choirs and bands participate in the Heritage Festival of Seattle. In 2006, the Lake City Symphonic and Jazz Band won first prize out of all schools in the Northwest, as did their orchestra. The Chamber Choir received a silver medal, the Jazz, Treble, and Concert choirs also received bronze medals.

The Lake City High School Marching Band performed for Good Morning America when it came to Coeur d'Alene on November 28, 2007.

The Lake City Drama department has won first prize at District Drama for Northern Idaho several years in a row, for the school with the most people placing for various scenes.

It is one of only a few schools to have its music department honored with the title of "Grammy Signature School".

Notable alumni
 Peter Riggs, businessman and member of the Idaho Senate

 Carson York, Offensive Lineman for the Oregon Ducks

 Byron Hout, Former Boise State defensive lineman, and Idaho State University defensive football coach.

See also

List of high schools in Idaho

References

External links
 
 Coeur d'Alene School District

Public high schools in Idaho
International Baccalaureate schools in Idaho
Schools in Kootenai County, Idaho
Buildings and structures in Coeur d'Alene, Idaho
1994 establishments in Idaho
Educational institutions established in 1994
School buildings completed in 1994